This is a list of awards, nominations, recognitions and achievements received by Enrique Gil during his career.

International Awards

Music

Film and Television

Popularity and Commerciality

Accolades from Media

Listicles

Notes

References

Lists of awards received by Filipino actor